Kansas City Suite (subtitled The Music of Benny Carter) is an album by pianist, composer and bandleader Count Basie featuring tracks recorded in 1960 and originally released on the Roulette label.

Reception

AllMusic awarded the album 4½ stars and its review by Scott Yanow states: "The band swings throughout as usual, with concise solos adding color to this memorable modern session".

Track listing
All compositions by Benny Carter
 "Vine Street Rumble" - 3:33
 "Katy-Do" - 4:19
 "Miss Missouri" - 5:10
 "Jackson County Jubilee" - 2:30
 "Sunset Glow" - 2:27
 "The Wiggle Walk" - 3:53
 "Meetin' Time" - 3:23
 "Paseo Promenade" - 3:23
 "Blue Five Jive" - 3:56
 "Rompin' at the Reno" - 2:14

Personnel 
Count Basie - piano
Sonny Cohn, Thad Jones, Joe Newman, Snooky Young - trumpet
Henry Coker, Al Grey, Benny Powell - trombone
Marshal Royal - alto saxophone, clarinet
Frank Wess - alto saxophone, tenor saxophone, flute
Frank Foster, Billy Mitchell - tenor saxophone
Charlie Fowlkes - baritone saxophone
Freddie Green - guitar
Eddie Jones - bass
Sonny Payne - drums
Benny Carter - arranger

References 

1960 albums
Count Basie Orchestra albums
Roulette Records albums
Albums produced by Teddy Reig